Monique Séka (born November 22, 1965; nicknamed the queen of Afro-zouk music) is a singer from Ivory Coast. With the musical fusion that she generates, Monique Seka's Afro-zouk music is popular across Ivory Coast, Africa, the Caribbean and the Indian Ocean.

Biography 
Séka developed an interest for music from childhood. She represents the third generation of a musical dynasty of Ivory Coast. Seka is the daughter of Seka Okoi an Ivorian singer famous in the 1970s. Seka was apprenticed by her father before joining the RTI Orchestra. That was the time she started to experiment mixing zouk and rhythms to create Afro Zouk, a combination that surprises and seduces music lovers at the same time. In the mid-1980s, Caribbean music invaded world markets. Seka blended into this trend and released her first album "Tantie Affoué" in 1985. In 1989, she signed the production of her music to Cape Verdian keyboardist Manu Lima and released her album "Missounwa". This mixture of zouk and African rhythms travelled beyond the African borders, and asserted recognition in the press and media. At the end of 1992, she met Dominique Richard, a founding member of Radio Sun, the first Afro-Caribbean radio station launched in Lyon in July 1993. Dominique became her producer and impresario. They got married on March 31, 1995, and after releasing a few albums they had a daughter Carolyn Richard, born February 9, 1998. In 1994, she again calls on Manu Lima for the arrangements of her new album and returned to the country with the album "Okaman". Subsequent albums of hers include  "Adéba" in 1997, "Yélélé" in 1999 and many "best of" with new titles: "Anthology" in 1999, "15 years 15 success" in 2003, "Obligada" in 2005, etc. Her success has earned her the support of many artists from various musical backgrounds such as "Yaye Demin", a hit song with Meiway.

Discography

Albums 
 1986 : Tantie affoué
 1989 : Missounwa, Éditions C.B.H.
 1995 : Okaman, Déclic
 1997 : Adeba
 1999 : Yelele, Sony Music 
 2000 : Anthologie
 2003 : Best of Album, Créon Music  
 2005 : Obligada

See also 
 Meiway
 List of Soukous musicians

References 

20th-century Ivorian women singers
1965 births
Living people
Place of birth missing (living people)
21st-century Ivorian women singers